Sandra C. Fernández (born 1964) is an Ecuadorian-American artist living in New Jersey. Her practice includes—separately and in combination—printmaking, photography, artist's books, soft sculpture, fiber art, assemblage, and installations; using a variety of materials, such as paper, thread, metal, wood, organic materials, and small found objects. Fernandez's work is rooted in the transborder experiences of exile, dislocation, relocation, memory, and self-conscious identity-construction/reconstruction.

Life

Childhood and education
Fernández was born in Queens, New York in 1964. Daughter of Ecuadorian parents who migrated to the United States in the late 50's as young adults. Before turning one year old, she moved with her mother to Quito. At age three, she began traveling to the United States to spend some summers with her father. She spent the majority of her early years in Ecuador where she learned traditional processes such as embroidery, weaving, and knitting. As a college student she studied Sociology and Literature while helping her grandfather, a bookseller. His collection of books from the 16th to the 20th century instilled in her an interest in paper and printed text. She returned to live in the United States in 1987, fleeing the violence of the León Febres Cordero presidency, which persecuted young people through "arbitrary detentions, extrajudicial executions, torture, sexual violence, and forced disappearances"

Fernández began studies in graphic design at the Madison Area Technical College in Wisconsin and received an associate in applied arts degree. She continued at the University of Wisconsin at Madison, receiving first a bachelor's degree in arts, to later graduate with a Master of Arts and Master of Fine Arts degrees in photography, printmaking and book arts, from the University of Wisconsin at Madison. She studied intaglio printmaking techniques at Taller Tres en Raya in Madrid, Spain. She was invited as an artist in residence at Sam Coronado's Serie Project (Austin TX) in 2005 & 2013 and to Self Help Graphics (Los Angeles CA) in 2017 in where the artists regularly discussed political issues related to Latinx life in the United States, particularly the impact of free trade agreements on the U.S./Mexico border and its residents.

Career
Sandra C. Fernández works primarily in printmaking into which she synthesizes serigraphy, intaglio, relief printing, chine-collé, and sewing, which she uses as a drawing tool. She also makes installations, public art, artist's books and assemblages. Her work reflects the issues that have affected her or that relate to her experience as a woman and a migrant, expressed through the use of specific symbols and processes. Some of these issues include sexism, political freedom, and the isolation or dislocation of the migrant. She often incorporates text, in both English and Spanish, to highlight the "dual spaces" she inhabits. Her work has often been critical of United States intervention in Latin America, reflecting her experience of living in Ecuador as well as her work as a teacher along the United States/Mexico border.

As early as the 1990s, Fernández began producing thematic series of works. Her first collection of artist's books as containers reflect various aspects of her cultural background and upbringing. The Paper Doll (Cucas) series are mixed media pieces that use the symbol of a skirt to address women's issues. The Border series emphasizes migration and the plight of DREAMers. young people who entered the United States as minors and who are granted temporary residency through the DREAM Act.

Fernández has been a professor at several universities in the United States including Hunter College,  Monmouth University, The University of Texas at Austin, The State University of New York at Buffalo, Illinois State University, and Illinois Wesleyan University. Her courses have included printmaking, artist's books, drawing, 2 & 3D foundations, photography, and art appreciation.

Fernández is a past director of the Guest Artist in Print Program (GAAP) at the University of Austin in Texas, the Printmaking Center of New Jersey. She is currently the director of the Consejo Gráfico Nacional , an independent coalition of printmaking workshops dedicated to the advancement and promotion of Latino printmakers through exhibitions and collaborative projects. She is also de owner and director of Sfernandez Art (Press & Taller).

Exhibits 
Sandra C. Fernández has had work exhibited in numerous group shows and solo exhibitions throughout the United States, Canada, Mexico, Perú, Ecuador, Argentina, Canada, Italy, Spain, Palestine, Qatar, United Arab Emirates, Japan and Indonesia. Her work was recently included in ¡Printing the Revolution! The Rise and Impact of Chicano Graphics, 1965 to Now, where for the first time, historical civil rights-era prints by Chicano artists are exhibited alongside works by graphic artists working from the 1980s to today.

Selected Public collections 
Smithsonian American Art Museum
The National Museum of Women in the Arts, Washington DC.
The Metropolitan Museum of Art (MET), Artist's Book Collection T. Watson Library. New York, NY.
Museum of Modern Art (MOMA), Franklin Furnace Archive
The Library of Congress, Washington D.C.
 Bibliothèque Nationale de France, Paris
 Mexic-Arte Museum, Austin, Texas
 San Antonio Museum of Art, San Antonio, Texas
 Bainbridge Island Museum of Art, Cynthia Sears Collection. Bainbridge Island, WA 
 Nettie Lee Benson Latin American Collection, University of Texas at Austin
 Amon Carter Brown Museum of American Art, Fort Worth, TX.
 Hood Museum of Art, Dartmouth College, Hanover, NH.
 Moody Library Special Collections Book Arts, Baylor University, Waco, TX.
 Contemporary Women Artists Files, Rutgers University Libraries
 Kohler Art Library Artist’s Books Collection, Madison, WI

References

Further reading
 
 Tatiana Reinoza, (2023) Reclaiming the Americas: Latinx Art and the Politics of Territory (Latinx: The Future is Now). University of Texas Press.

External links
 

1964 births
American women printmakers
21st-century American printmakers
Women book artists
Book artists
University of Wisconsin–Madison alumni
Ecuadorian women artists
University of Texas at Austin faculty
Seton Hall University faculty
Monmouth University faculty
Hunter College faculty
People from Quito
Artists from New Jersey
Living people
American women academics
21st-century American women artists
21st-century Ecuadorian women